Wednesday's Child may refer to:

Wednesday's Child, part of "Monday's Child", the nursery rhyme
Wednesday's Child (play), a 1934 Broadway drama
Wednesday's Child (film), a 1934 film adaptation of the play
Wednesday's Child (novel), a novel by crime writer Peter Robinson
 "Wednesday's Child", a song by Emilíana Torrini from the 1999 album Love in the Time of Science
 Wednesday's Child, a long-running weekly segment on Boston station WBZ-TV's news programming
 "Wednesday's Child", a 2022 episode of the BBC medical drama Casualty
 "Wednesday's Child is Full of Woe", the 1st episode of the Netflix show Wednesday